The 76th Infantry Division was created on 26 August 1939 together with the 23rd Infantry Division in Potsdam.

History 
The division was annihilated in the Battle of Stalingrad and reformed by the OB West on 17 February 1943.

In 1944, the 76th ID was involved in heavy fighting with Soviet troops in the Ukraine and eastern Romania. 
In the defensive battles for Letcani and Iaşi (German: Jassy) the 76th ID suffered heavy losses and had to withdraw across the Bahlui River. 
In September and October 1944, the 76th ID was again refreshed with new troops before surrendering in 1945 in Slovakia.

Organization 
Structure of the division:

 Headquarters
 178th Infantry Regiment
 203rd Infantry Regiment
 230th Infantry Regiment
 176th Artillery Regiment
 176th Reconnaissance Battalion
 176th Anti-Tank Battalion
 176th Engineer Battalion
 176th Signal Battalion
 176th Divisional Supply Group

Commanding officers
General der Artillerie Maximilian de Angelis, 1 September 1939
Generalleutnant Carl Rodenburg, 26 January 1942 – 31 January 1943, POW

Second formation 
General der Infanterie Erich Abraham, 1 April 1943
Generalleutnant Otto-Hermann Brücker, July 1944
General der Infanterie Erich Abraham, August 1944
Generalleutnant Siegfried von Rekowski, 17 October 1944
Oberst Dr. Wilhelm-Moritz Freiherr von Bissing, 8 February 1945
Generalmajor Erhard-Heinrich Berner, 14 February 1945

References 

Military units and formations established in 1939
0*076
German units at the Battle of Stalingrad
1939 establishments in Germany
Military units and formations disestablished in 1945